Love Is... is the fourth studio album of Filipino TV host, actress-singer Toni Gonzaga and her third under Star Records, released on April 27, 2008 in the Philippines in CD format and digital download. The carrier single, "One Hello", which was originally done by Randy Crawford was used as the theme song of the Star Cinema-movie, When Love Begins.  The second single, "Incapable", was a commercial failure receiving very limited radio airplay with no accompanying music video. "Take Me, I'll Follow", a Bobby Caldwell original was the album's third and final single.

As of August 2018, the album sold 25,000 units and 11,000 are pure sales. The record is the most streamed album of Gonzaga on Spotify Philippines while "Someone's Always Saying Goodbye" garnered the most stream counts with more than 23 million.

Background
Love Is... contains 11 which composed of three OPM original and nine revival tracks. It is Toni's third album under Star Records and was released on April 27, 2008. This album was said very close to her, "Ang laki talaga ng pasasalamat ko sa Star Records dahil pinagkakatiwalaan nila ako with another album. Lahat ng kanta dito ay close to my heart at masaya ako nang i-record ko ang mga kanta," says Toni. Moreover, according to Nixon Sy, Star Records' promo unit head, "Her first album with Star Records, Toni: You Complete Me, was certified gold and her sophomore album, Toni Gonzaga Falling In Love, was awarded platinum. At such a young age, Toni is being recognized as one of the movers of the music industry and it's a privilege for Star Records to produce another winner for her."

Singles
One Hello is the lead single of the album. It was originally done by Randy Crawford. The song was also used as the theme song of the Star Cinema-movie, When Love Begins.cIncapable was released as a second single from the album. Take Me, I'll Follow was the third and final single released from the album. It was a Bobby Caldwell original.

Other Songs
If I Give You My Heart was released as a single and an official soundtrack and to promote the film, Paano Na Kaya?, in which stars by Kim Chiu and Gerald Anderson.

Track listing

 track 1 - "One Hello" is a remake of an original song by Randy Crawford
 track 4 - "If I Gave You My Heart" is the theme song of the 2010 film, Paano Na Kaya.
 track 5 - "If Ever You're In My Arms Again" is a remake of an original song by Peabo Bryson and was used as the theme song of her leading role film My Big Love.

Personnel
 Malou N. Santos – executive producer
 Annabelle Regaldo-Borja – executive producer
 Christian Martinez – over all album producer
 Rox B. Santos – associate album producer
 Roxy Liquigan – star adprom head
 Nixon Sy – star adprom head for audio
 Peewee Apostol – head, star song, inc
 Beth Faustino – music copyright coordinator
 Patrick Kevin Cabreba IV – album design
 Doc Marlon Pecjo – photography
 Pam Quiones – stylist
 Krist Bansuelo – make-up
 Macy Dionisio – hair & make-up

Certifications

References 

2008 albums
Toni Gonzaga albums
Star Music albums